A list of notable members of the Christian Democratic Union.


A B C D E F G H I J K L M N O P Q R S T U V W X Y Z

A

Manfred Abelein
Wilhelm Abeln
Michael von Abercron
Ulrich Adam
Christoph Ahlhaus
Peter Albach
Ernst Albrecht
Dieter Althaus
Peter Altmaier
Peter Altmeier
Walther Amelung
Jutta Appelt
Karl Arnold
Roger Asmussen
Wolfgang Aßbrock

B

Jürgen Banzer
Thomas Bareiß
Uwe Barschel
Norbert Barthle
Rainer Barzel
Wolf Bauer
Günter Baumann
Adolf Bauser
Ernst-Reinhard Beck
Alfred Becker
Rudolf Beckmann
Veronika Bellmann
Ernst Benda
Friedrich Berentzen
Sabine Bergmann-Pohl
Christoph Bergner
Otto Bernhardt
Ole von Beust
Kurt Biedenkopf
Ulrich Biel
Adolf Bieringer
Clemens Binninger
Alfred Biolek
Andreas Birkmann
Carl-Eduard von Bismarck
Peter Bleser
Harry Blum
Norbert Blüm
Antje Blumenthal
Philipp Freiherr von Boeselager
Reimer Böge
Friedrich Bohl
Franz Böhm
Maria Böhmer
Wolfgang Böhmer
Rudolf Böhmler
Jochen Borchert
Ulrich Born
Wolfgang Börnsen
Wolfgang Bosbach
Volker Bouffier
Klaus Brähmig
Michael Brand
Helmut Brandt
Aenne Brauksiepe
Ralf Brauksiepe
Heinrich von Brentano
Birgit Breuel
Karl Brüggemann
Monika Brüning
Georg Brunnhuber
Gerd Bucerius
Ewald Bucher
Karl von Buchka

C

Lorenz Caffier
Karl Carstens
Manfred Carstens
Peter Harry Carstensen
Daniel Caspary
Sabine Christiansen
Thies Christophersen
Birgit Collin-Langen
Gitta Connemann
Claudia Nolte
Herbert Czaja

D

Ulrich Daldrup
Oskar-Hubert Dennhardt
Arved Deringer
Otto Dibelius
Eberhard Diepgen
Alfred Dregger

E

Jürgen Echternach
Christian Ehler
Hermann Ehlers
Henning Eichberg
Dirk Elbers
Rainer Eppelmann
Ludwig Erhard
Joachim Erwin
Franz Etzel

F

Joachim Fest
Hans Filbinger
Eva Gräfin Finck von Finckenstein
Axel Fischer
Karl-Heinz Florenz
Michael Freytag
Siegfried Fricke
Ferdinand Friedensburg
Michel Friedman
Bernhard Friedmann
Joseph Frings
Hans Furler
Wolfgang Fürniß

G

Michael Gahler
Jürgen Gansel
Axel Gedaschko
Hans Geisler
Heiner Geißler
Eugen Gerstenmaier
Roland Gewalt
Shanta Ghosh
Eberhard Gienger
Gerd Gies
Cemile Giousouf
Peter Gloystein
Lutz Goepel
Alfred Gomolka
Wilhelm von Gottberg
Rudolf Götz
Johann Baptist Gradl
Ingeborg Gräßle
Hermann Gröhe
Michael Grosse-Brömer
Manfred Grund
Herlind Gundelach
Horst Günther

H

Martin Haag
Walter Hallstein
Monika Harms
Karl-Günther von Hase
Reiner Haseloff
Kai-Uwe von Hassel
Bruno Heck
Helmut Heiderich
Gustav Heinemann
Heinrich Hellwege
Fritz Hellwig
Dieter Helm
Josef Hempelmann
Rudolf Henke
Hubert Hermans
Andreas Hermes
Hans Herwarth von Bittenfeld
Roman Herzog
Hellmuth Heye
Bernd Heynemann
Hugo Hickmann
Ruth Hieronymi
Reinhold Hilbers
Theodor Hillenhinrichs
Werner Hilpert
Peter Hintze
Günther Hochgartz
Martin Hohmann
Karl Holzamer
Franz-Josef Holzenkamp
Hartmut Honka
Karsten Friedrich Hoppenstedt
Franziska Hoppermann
Hans Horn
Herbert Hupka

I

Bernhard Ilg
Erich Iltgen

J

Michael Jacobi
Rolf Jähnichen
Peter Jahr
Georg Jarzembowski
Elisabeth Jeggle
Philipp Jenninger
Pascual Jordan
Franz Josef Jung
Ulrich Junghanns

K

Jakob Kaiser
Manfred Kanther
Volker Kauder
Walter von Keudell
Walther Leisler Kiep
Kurt Georg Kiesinger
Eckart von Klaeden
Ewa Klamt
Christa Klaß
Hans Hugo Klein
Egon Klepsch
Jürgen Klimke
Reiner Klimke
Julia Klöckner
Wilhelm Knabe
Dieter-Lebrecht Koch
Roland Koch
Jens Koeppen
Eugen Kogon
Helmut Kohl
Erich Köhler
Horst Köhler
Kristina Köhler
Heinrich Konen
Christoph Konrad
Walter Korn
Waldemar Kraft
Annegret Kramp-Karrenbauer
Wilhelm Kratz
Günther Krause
Alexander Krauß
Heinrich Krone
Rüdiger Kruse
André Kuper

L

Karl A. Lamers
Norbert Lammert
Heinz Lange
Gerd Langguth
Armin Laschet
Karl-Josef Laumann
Hanna-Renate Laurien
Kurt Lechner
Klaus-Heiner Lehne
Robert Lehr
Ursula Lehr
Helmut Lemke
Vera Lengsfeld
Carl Otto Lenz
Hanfried Lenz
Otto Lenz
Wilhelm Lenz
Christine Lieberknecht
Ingbert Liebing
Peter Liese
Georg Lindner
Peter Lorenz
Hubertus Prinz zu Löwenstein-Wertheim-Freudenberg
Heinrich Lübke
Hermann Lutz
Heinrich Lützenkirchen

M

Lothar de Maizière
Thomas de Maizière
Kurt Malangré
Thomas Mann
Stefan Mappus
Martin Sonneborn
Kurt Martin
Hans-Peter Mayer
Gerhard Mayer-Vorfelder
David McAllister
Siegfried Meister
Erich Mende
Hans-Joachim von Merkatz
Friedrich Merz
Mario Mettbach
Horst Metz
Laurenz Meyer
Franz Meyers
Georg Milbradt
Mike Mohring
Karl-Theodor Molinari
Jürgen Möllemann
Carsten Müller
Gebhard Müller
Nadine Müller
Alfred Müller-Armack
Werner Münch

N

Hartmut Nassauer
Bernd Neumann
Hubert Ney
Clemens Nieting
Günter Nooke

O

Theodor Oberländer
Helma Orosz
Henning Otte
Aygül Özkan

P

Doris Pack
Rudi Pawelka
Hans Peter Pawlik
Eduard Pestel
Busso Peus
Joachim Pfeiffer
Robert Pferdmenges
Heinrich Pickel
Markus Pieper
Elmar Pieroth
Arnold Poepke
Ronald Pofalla
Gerhard Pohl
Ruprecht Polenz
Werner Pöls
Horst Posdorf
Hans-Gert Pöttering

Q

Reinhold Quaatz
Godelieve Quisthoudt-Rowohl

R

Heribert Rech
Reinhold Rehs
Katherina Reiche
Herbert Reul
Heinz Riesenhuber
Berndt Röder
Franz-Josef Röder
Hubert Rohde
Gerhard Rohner
Hannelore Rönsch
Matthias Rößler
Petra Roth
Norbert Röttgen
Volker Rühe

S

Bernhard Sälzer
Karin Sander
Jürgen Scharf
Bernhard Schätzle
Thomas Schäuble
Wolfgang Schäuble
Manfred Schell
Fritz Schenk
Emil Schlee
Hanns Martin Schleyer
Otto Schmidt
Dieter Schmitt
Ingo Schmitt
Joseph Schmitt
Kurt Schmücker
Herbert Schneider
Horst Schnellhardt
Birgit Schnieber-Jastram
Andreas Schockenhoff
Rupert Scholz
Joachim Graf von Schönburg-Glauchau
Josef Schrage
Fritz Schramma
Waldemar Schreckenberger
Walther Schreiber
Gerhard Schröder
Heinrich Schröder
Jürgen Schröder
Ole Schröder
Wolfgang Schulhoff
Uwe Schummer
Uwe Schünemann
Ludwig Schuster
Andreas Schwab
Henning Schwarz
Christian Schwarz-Schilling
Elisabeth Schwarzhaupt
Hartmut Schwesinger
Hans-Christoph Seebohm
Berndt Seite
Rudolf Seiters
Bernd Siebert
Kurt Sieveking
Renate Sommer
Jens Spahn
Lothar Späth
Friede Springer
Frank Steffel
Theodor Steltzer
Christian von Stetten
Wolfgang von Stetten
Dirk Stettner
Gerhard Stoltenberg
Monika Stolz
Peter Straub
Otto Stumpf
Rita Süssmuth

T

Erwin Teufel
Christine Teusch
Friedrich Thielen
Stanislaw Tillich
Robert Tillmanns
Jürgen Todenhöfer
Klaus Töpfer

U

Gunnar Uldall
Thomas Ulmer

V

Bernhard Vogel
Angelika Volquartz

W

Joseph Wagenbach
Carl-Ludwig Wagner
Herbert Wagner
Walter Wallmann
Marco Wanderwitz
Johanna Wanka
Hans-Joachim Watzke
Helene Weber
Johannes Weber
Karl Weber
Gerald Weiß
Richard von Weizsäcker
Klaus Welle
Ingo Wellenreuther
Dietrich Wersich
Karl von Westphalen
Rainer Wieland
Johannes Wilde
Klaus-Peter Willsch
Dorothee Wilms
Heinrich Windelen
Hermann Winkler
Klaus Wiswe
Oliver Wittke
Karl von Wogau
Guido Wolf
Karin Wolff
Manfred Wörner
Christian Wulff

Y

Helmut Yström

Z

Erich Zander
Gerhard Zeitel
Joachim Zeller
Theo Zwanziger

References

 
Christian Democratic Union